A California Romance is a 1922 American comedy film directed by Jerome Storm and written by Charles E. Banks. The film stars John Gilbert, Estelle Taylor, George Siegmann, Jack McDonald and C.E. Anderson. The film was released on December 24, 1922, by Fox Film Corporation.

Cast           
John Gilbert as Don Patricio Fernando
Estelle Taylor as Donna Dolores
George Siegmann as Don Juan Diego
Jack McDonald as Don Manuel Casca
C.E. Anderson as Steve

References

External links
 

1922 films
1920s English-language films
Silent American comedy films
Fox Film films
Films directed by Jerome Storm
American silent feature films
American black-and-white films
1922 comedy films
1920s American films